The Shanghai Ring Expressway, designated G1503, formerly designated as A30 and G1501, and also known as the Shanghai Suburb Ring Expressway, is a  that encircles Shanghai, a direct-controlled municipality in the People's Republic of China. It is entirely in Shanghai, except for a small section in the nearby province of Jiangsu at its northwest end.

It forms the final ring in a series of four orbital roads around the city of Shanghai, with the others being the Inner Ring Road, Middle Ring Road, and the S20 Outer Ring Expressway. Part of G1503 Shanghai Ring Expressway in northern Pudong New Area is concurrent with the third ring, the S20 Outer Ring Expressway, due to the nature of the coastline of Shanghai with the East China Sea.

Route 
The kilometre zero of the Shanghai Ring Expressway is located at an interchange with S20 Outer Ring Expressway and Yixian Elevated Road in Baoshan District, and increase in a clockwise fashion. Immediately to the east of the interchange, the expressway descends into the Outer Ring Tunnel, so named because this section is concurrent with S20 Outer Ring Expressway. As the tunnel ends in Pudong New Area, it becomes an elevated highway for a short portion, curving southeast and then south, reaching the Wuzhou Avenue Interchange. Here, the concurrency with S20 Outer Ring Expressway ends, with the Outer Ring Expressway continuing to the south, Wuzhou Avenue to the west, while the Shanghai Ring Expressway continues east.

The expressway curves to the southeast, meeting the G40 Shanghai–Xi'an Expressway at its eastern terminus. The expressway continues southward, interchanging with S1 Yingbin Expressway, S32 Shanghai–Jiaxing–Huzhou Expressway, and S2 Shanghai–Luchaogang Expressway as it traverses Pudong New Area before curving west and entering Fengxian District. Its east section, from Longdong Avenue to former Nanhui District border, was named as Yuandong Avenue before the expressway is finished and became a ring in 2008.

The expressway travels west along the southern suburbs of Shanghai, passing through Fengxian District, where it interchanges with S4 Shanghai–Jinshan Expressway and Jinshan District. At an interchange with S19 Xinnong–Jinshanwei Expressway to the south and S36 Tinglin–Fengjing Expressway to the west, the expressway continues north, passing through Songjiang District, where it intersects with the concurrent G60 Shanghai–Kunming Expressway and G92 Hangzhou Bay Ring Expressway, and Qingpu District, where it interchanges with the G50 Shanghai–Chongqing Expressway. It then leaves the direct-controlled municipality of Shanghai for a short portion, entering the city of Kunshan in Jiangsu province, where it curves to the northeast and intersects with the concurrent G2 Beijing–Shanghai Expressway and G42 Shanghai–Chengdu Expressway at the Anting Interchange.

The expressway turns east, back into the Jiading District of Shanghai, where it intersects with the G15 Shenyang–Haikou Expressway and the S5 Shanghai–Jiading Expressway. Re-entering Baoshan District, the expressway becomes an elevated road, travelling above Fujin Road. At Tongji Road, the expressway curves to the south, paralleling the elevated Line 3 of the Shanghai Metro. This section is also known as Tongji Elevated Road, due to the fact that it runs above Tongji Road. At the southern end of Tongji Elevated Road, the Shanghai Ring Expressway returns to its kilometre zero marker.

Exit list

References

See also
 Expressways of Shanghai

Chinese national-level expressways
Expressways in Shanghai
Expressways in Jiangsu